= Results of the 1972 Canadian federal election =

1972 Canadian federal election

== Results by Province and Territory ==
=== Alberta ===
Results in Alberta
Party	Seats	Second	Third	Fourth	Fifth	Sixth	Seventh	Votes	%	+/-
Progressive Conservative	19	0	0	0	0	0	0	409,857	57.65	
Liberals	0	17	2	0	0	0	0	177,599	24.98	
NDP	0	2	16	1	0	0	0	89,811	12.63	
Social Credit	0	0	1	18	0	0	0	31,689	4.46	
No affiliation to a recognised party	0	0	0	0	7	4	1	1,694	0.24	
Independent	0	0	0	0	2	0	0	302	0.04	
Total	19							710,952	100.0	

=== British Columbia ===
Results in British Columbia
Party	Seats	Second	Third	Fourth	Fifth	Sixth	Seventh	Votes	%	+/-
NDP	11	2	10	0	0	0	0	332,345	35.05	
Progressive Conservative	8	11	4	0	0	0	0	313,253	33.03	
Liberals	4	10	9	0	0	0	0	274,468	28.94	
Social Credit	0	0	0	19	0	0	0	25,107	2.65	
No affiliation to a recognised party	0	0	0	0	6	6	2	1,633	0.17	
Independent	0	0	0	1	4	1	0	1,483	0.16	
Total	23							948,289	100.0	

=== Manitoba ===
Results in Manitoba
Party	Seats	Second	Third	Fourth	Fifth	Sixth	Votes	%	+/-
Progressive Conservative	8	3	2	0	0	0	184,363	41.6	
Liberals	2	6	5	0	0	0	136,906	30.89	
NDP	3	4	6	0	0	0	116,474	26.28	
Social Credit	0	0	0	5	0	0	3,228	0.73	
No affiliation to a recognised party	0	0	0	3	3	1	1,666	0.38	
Independent	0	0	0	2	0	0	517	0.12	
Total	13						443,154	100.0	

=== New Brunswick ===
Results in New Brunswick
Party	Seats	Second	Third	Fourth	Fifth	Sixth	Votes	%	+/-
Progressive Conservative	5	5	1	0	0	0	136,905	46.81	
Liberals	5	5	0	0	0	0	125,935	43.06	
NDP	0	0	8	1	0	1	18,466	6.31	
Social Credit	0	0	1	5	0	0	9,237	3.16	
No affiliation to a recognised party	0	0	0	1	0	0	1,109	0.38	
Independent	0	0	0	0	1	0	839	0.29	
Total	10						292,491	100.0	

=== Newfoundland and Labrador ===
Results in Newfoundland and Labrador
Party	Seats	Second	Third	Fourth	Fifth	Votes	%	+/-
Progressive Conservative	4	3	0	0	0	85,857	49.05	
Liberals	3	4	0	0	0	78,505	44.85	
NDP	0	0	7	0	0	8,165	4.66	
No affiliation to a recognised party	0	0	0	1	0	1,637	0.94	
Independent	0	0	0	1	0	616	0.35	
Social Credit	0	0	0	1	1	266	0.15	
Total	7					175,046	100.0	

=== Northwest Territories ===
Results in Northwest Territories
Party	Seats	Second	Third	Votes	%	+/-
NDP	1	0	0	5,597	39.82	
Progressive Conservative	0	1	0	4,339	30.87	
Liberals	0	0	1	4,121	29.32	
Total	1			14,057	100.0	

=== Nova Scotia ===
Results in Nova Scotia
Party	Seats	Second	Third	Fourth	Votes	%	+/-
Progressive Conservative	10	1	0	0	204,460	53.37	
Liberals	1	9	1	0	129,738	33.87	
NDP	0	1	10	0	47,072	12.29	
Social Credit	0	0	0	4	1,316	0.34	
No affiliation to a recognised party	0	0	0	3	501	0.13	
Total	11				383,087	100.0	

=== Ontario ===
Results in Ontario
Party	Seats	Second	Third	Fourth	Fifth	Sixth	Seventh	Votes	%	+/-
Progressive Conservative	40	31	17	0	0	0	0	1,399,148	39.11	
Liberals	36	47	4	0	0	0	0	1,366,468	38.19	
NDP	11	10	67	0	0	0	0	768,176	21.47	
No affiliation to a recognised party	1	0	0	18	17	3	1	23,071	0.64	
Social Credit	0	0	0	20	4	1	0	12,937	0.36	
Independent	0	0	0	10	3	0	0	7,898	0.22	
Total	88							3,577,698	100.0	

=== Prince Edward Island ===
Results in Prince Edward Island
Party	Seats	Second	Third	Fourth	Votes	%	+/-
Progressive Conservative	3	1	0	0	29,419	51.93	
Liberals	1	3	0	0	22,950	40.51	
NDP	0	0	4	0	4,229	7.46	
Social Credit	0	0	0	1	55	0.1	
Total	4				56,653	100.0	

=== Quebec ===
Results in Quebec
Party	Seats	Second	Third	Fourth	Fifth	Sixth	Seventh	Eighth	Votes	%	+/-
Liberals	56	17	1	0	0	0	0	0	1,289,139	48.92	
Social Credit	15	33	16	5	1	0	0	0	639,207	24.25	
Progressive Conservative	2	19	50	2	1	0	0	0	457,418	17.36	
NDP	0	4	6	48	4	0	0	0	179,238	6.8	
Independent	1	0	1	8	9	4	2	0	44,579	1.69	
No affiliation to a recognised party	0	1	0	2	18	11	4	1	24,218	0.92	
Rhinoceros	0	0	0	1	0	0	0	0	1,565	0.06	
Total	74								2,635,364	100.0	

=== Saskatchewan ===
Results in Saskatchewan
Party	Seats	Second	Third	Fourth	Fifth	Sixth	Votes	%	+/-
Progressive Conservative	7	4	2	0	0	0	159,629	36.91	
NDP	5	8	0	0	0	0	155,195	35.88	
Liberals	1	1	11	0	0	0	109,342	25.28	
Social Credit	0	0	0	13	0	0	7,717	1.78	
No affiliation to a recognised party	0	0	0	0	2	2	422	0.1	
Independent	0	0	0	0	2	0	199	0.05	
Total	13						432,504	100.0	

=== Yukon ===
Results in Yukon
Party	Seats	Second	Third	Fourth	Votes	%	+/-
Progressive Conservative	1	0	0	0	4,332	53.04	
Liberals	0	1	0	0	2,633	32.24	
NDP	0	0	1	0	951	11.64	
Independent	0	0	0	1	252	3.09	
Total	1				8,168	100.0	
